WLJN-FM is a radio station licensed to Traverse City, Michigan, broadcasting on 89.9 MHz FM.  WLJN-FM airs a format consisting of Contemporary Christian music and a few Christian talk and teaching programs, and is owned by Good News Media. WLJN-FM signed on the air at 89.9 MHz on October 1, 1989.

Good News Media purchased the silent WCZW 107.9 FM in Charlevoix, Michigan from Midwestern Broadcasting Company in December 2015.  WCZW, which had been simulcasting the classic hits format of 107.5 WCCW-FM, switched to a simulcast of WLJN-FM.  The station took on new call letters of WLJD effective December 29, 2015, although the change was not reflected by the Federal Communications Commission until August 2016.

References

External links
WLJN's website

LJN-FM
Moody Radio affiliate stations
Radio stations established in 1989
LJN-FM